The 2018 Knoxville Challenger was a professional tennis tournament played on indoor hard courts. It was the fifteenth edition of the tournament which was part of the 2018 ATP Challenger Tour. It took place in Knoxville, United States between 5 and 11 November 2018.

Singles main-draw entrants

Seeds

 1 Rankings are as of October 29, 2018.

Other entrants
The following players received wildcards into the singles main draw:
  Tennys Sandgren
  Timo Stodder
  Preston Touliatos
  J. J. Wolf

The following player received entry into the singles main draw as a special exempt:
  Tommy Paul

The following players received entry into the singles main draw as alternates:
  Christian Harrison
  Mitchell Krueger

The following players received entry from the qualifying draw:
  Emilio Gómez
  Michael Redlicki
  Evan Song
  Mikael Ymer

Champions

Singles

 Reilly Opelka def.  Bjorn Fratangelo 7–5, 4–6, 7–6(7–2).

Doubles

 Toshihide Matsui /  Frederik Nielsen def.  Hunter Reese /  Tennys Sandgren 7–6(8–6), 7–5.

References

2018 ATP Challenger Tour
2018
2018 in American tennis
2018 in sports in Tennessee